National Gridiron League may refer to:

 National Gridiron League (Australia), a proposed American football league
 National Gridiron League (United States), a proposed indoor American football league